B. Naganna is an Indian film director and writer working in Kannada cinema. He is the son of acclaimed producer and distributor R. Lakshman.

After working as an associate director in the K. S. L. Swamy directorial Jimmy Gallu in 1982, Naganna debuted as a director through the film Samrat in 1994.  His well-known movies include O Premave (1999), Kotigobba (2001), Gokarna (2003), Vishnu Sena (2005) and Krantiveera Sangolli Rayanna (2012). For the historical drama, Sangolli Rayanna, he won the Best director award at the Times of India film awards.

Naganna headed the panel of the Karnataka State Film Awards for the year 2015.

Filmography

References

External links
 
 B Naganna Kannada Director at Chitraloka

Living people
Indian film directors
Kannada film directors
Kannada screenwriters
20th-century Indian film directors
21st-century Indian film directors
Film directors from Karnataka
Screenwriters from Karnataka
Year of birth missing (living people)